No Introduction is the debut studio album by American rapper Tyga. It was released on June 10, 2008, by Decaydance Records, serving as Tyga's first independent release with the label. Recording sessions took place from 2005 to 2008, with Pete Wentz serving as the records executive producers, while the production was handled by Patrick Stump and S*A*M & Sluggo; as well as two guest appearances from Tyga's then-label-mates Travie McCoy and Alex DeLeon, among others.

The album was supported by three singles: "Diamond Life" featuring Patty Crash, "Coconut Juice" featuring Travie McCoy, and "AIM".

Music and lyrics
The album identifies Tyga's past effort of alternative rap rock due to the pop rock style of Decaydance Records label. This was the rapper's "clean" debut attempt, which features no explicit language or references, except of one vague noun use of the word "shit" in the song "Pillow Talkin'" and some explicit language in the deluxe edition tracks, before his full shift to explicit style of rapping in 2009, however, Tyga did use profanity during his early mixtape days, such as Young on Probation.

Singles
The album's debut single, called "Diamond Life" was released on December 17, 2007. The song features guest vocals from Patty Crash, while the production was handled by S*A*M & Sluggo.

The album's second single, called "Coconut Juice" was released on March 22, 2008. The song features guest vocals from Tyga's cousin and an American recording artist Travie McCoy, while the production was handled by S*A*M & Sluggo.

The album's third and final single, "AIM" was released on January 3, 2009. The song was produced by S*A*M & Sluggo, and Lu Balz.

Critical reception

AllMusic editor Jason Lymangrover noted how the pop rap production on the record showcases both its aspiration to have "the widest (or most mainstream) appeal possible" and Tyga's presence as a rapper, concluding that "his voice is smooth, his attack is skillful, and regardless of the inherent lack of depth, the disc is a fun and easygoing romp, fitting for a Friday drive home or a trip to the club." Andres Tardio from HipHopDX praised Tyga for being able to construct "inspirational tales about broken families ("Don't Regret It Now", "2 AM")" with an ability to "derive soulful rhymes from his life's tribulations" but criticized the record for containing "terrible love songs ("AIM", "First Timers")" and tracks with a "flawed concept ("Cartoonz", "EST. (80's Baby))", saying that "No Introduction is a nice album for the teens with a few gems sprinkled in between. While the album isn't exactly great, it does have a lot to applaud." Susan Kim of RapReviews also commended Tyga for delivering fierce and powerful lyricism on tracks like "Don't Regret It Now", "2 AM" and "Diamond Life" but felt his reversion to "rudimentary wordplay and subject matter" and "failed love ballads" with uninspiring piano melodies to appeal to a younger demographic hampers his longevity in the hip hop scene, saying that "[I]n his debut, Tyga's No Introduction is a hit or miss. Some may praise that the maturity in his lyricism is apparent in tracks about his family, while other may see his lyricism to be undeveloped when viewed as a whole. Taking into consideration that his fan base probably consists of young, teenage girls, his debut wasn't a definite flop after all."

Track listing

Notes
 "Diamond Life" was featured in the video games; including 2008's Need for Speed: Undercover and 2009's Madden, the song was also included in the movie Fighting (2009).

Charts

References 

Tyga albums
2008 debut albums
Albums produced by S*A*M and Sluggo
Decaydance Records albums
West Coast hip hop albums